The 1977 Houston Astros season was a season in American baseball. The team finished third in the National League West with a record of 81–81, 17 games behind the Los Angeles Dodgers.

Offseason 
 December 8, 1976: Greg Gross was traded by the Astros to the Chicago Cubs for Julio González.
 January 11, 1977: John Butcher was drafted by the Astros in the 1st round (5th pick) of the secondary phase of the 1977 Major League Baseball draft, but did not sign.
 January 25, 1977: Paul Siebert was traded by the Astros to the San Diego Padres for Mike Allen (minors).
 March 26, 1977: Rob Andrews and cash were traded by the Astros to the San Francisco Giants for Willie Crawford and Rob Sperring.

Regular season

Season standings

Record vs. opponents

Notable transactions 
 June 7, 1977: Scott Loucks was drafted by the Astros in the 5th round of the 1977 Major League Baseball draft.
 June 15, 1977: Willie Crawford was traded by the Astros to the Oakland Athletics for Denny Walling.

Roster

Player stats

Batting

Starters by position 
Note: Pos = Position; G = Games played; AB = At bats; H = Hits; Avg. = Batting average; HR = Home runs; RBI = Runs batted in

Other batters 
Note: G = Games played; AB = At bats; H = Hits; Avg. = Batting average; HR = Home runs; RBI = Runs batted in

Pitching

Starting pitchers 
Note: G = Games pitched; IP = Innings pitched; W = Wins; L = Losses; ERA = Earned run average; SO = Strikeouts

Other pitchers 
Note: G = Games pitched; IP = Innings pitched; W = Wins; L = Losses; ERA = Earned run average; SO = Strikeouts

Relief pitchers 
Note: G = Games pitched; W = Wins; L = Losses; SV = Saves; ERA = Earned run average; SO = Strikeouts

Farm system 

LEAGUE CHAMPIONS: Charleston

References

External links
1977 Houston Astros season at Baseball Reference

Houston Astros seasons
Houston Astros season
Houston Astro